An annular solar eclipse will occur on Monday, November 15, 2077, with a magnitude of 0.9371. A solar eclipse occurs when the Moon passes between Earth and the Sun, thereby totally or partially obscuring the image of the Sun for a viewer on Earth. An annular solar eclipse occurs when the Moon's apparent diameter is smaller than the Sun's, blocking most of the Sun's light and causing the Sun to look like an annulus (ring). An annular eclipse appears as a partial eclipse over a region of the Earth thousands of kilometres wide. The path of annularity will cross North America and South America. This will be the 47th solar eclipse of Saros cycle 134. A small annular eclipse will cover only 94% of the Sun in a very broad path, 262 km wide at maximum, and will last 7 minutes and 54 seconds. Occurring only 4 days after apogee (Apogee on Thursday, November 11, 2077), the Moon's apparent diameter is smaller.

More details about the Annular Solar Eclipse on Monday, November 15, 2077 

Eclipse Magnitude = 0.93707

Eclipse Obscuration = 0.87810

Gamma = 0.47047

Saros Series = 134th (47 of 71)

Greatest Eclipse = 15 Nov 2077 17:06:10.2 UTC

Ecliptic Conjunction = 15 Nov 2077 17:00:37.8 UTC

Equatorial Conjunction = 15 Nov 2077 16:46:06.0 UTC

Sun right ascension = 15.44

Sun declination = -18.8

Sun diameter (arcseconds) = 1940.2

Moon right ascension = 15.45

Moon declination = -18.4

Moon diameter (arcseconds) = 1793.8

Geocentric Libration of the Moon

Latitude: 3.3 degrees south

Longitude: 0.6 degrees west

Direction: 12.7 (NNE)

Date of this Annular Solar Eclipse: Monday, 15 November 2077

Related eclipses

Solar eclipses 2076–2079

Saros 134

Tritos series

References

External links 

2077 11 15
2077 in science
2077 11 15
2077 11 15